The Arrondissement of Tournai-Mouscron is one of the seven administrative arrondissements in the Walloon province of Hainaut, Belgium. The Arrondissement of Tournai-Mouscron was created in 2019 by the merger of the former arrondissements of Tournai and Mouscron.

Municipalities
The Administrative Arrondissement of Mouscron consists of the following municipalities (with their Dutch name):
 Antoing
 Brunehaut
 Celles
 Comines-Warneton (Komen-Waasten)
 Estaimpuis (Steenput)
 Leuze-en-Hainaut
 Mont-de-l'Enclus
 Mouscron (Moeskroen)
 Pecq
 Péruwelz
 Rumes
 Tournai (Doornik)

References

Tournai-Mouscron